Olga Kennard, Lady Burgen  ( Weisz; 23 March 1924 – 1 March 2023) was a Hungarian-born British scientist who specialised in crystallography. She was the founder of the Cambridge Crystallographic Data Centre.

Kennard's research focused on determining the structures of organic molecules, including the first three-dimensional structure of adenosine triphosphate and particularly the different forms of DNA.

Together with JD Bernal she believed in the value of collating scientific data in a central archive, this began the Cambridge Structural Database (CSD), collating crystal structures of mainly organic molecules. Kennard was also involved, at CSD, in the founding of the Protein Data Bank, and of the EMBL nucleotide sequence data library (later, European Nucleotide Archive).

Early life and education 
Kennard was born in Budapest, Hungary on 23 March 1924, to Joir and Catherina Weisz. She moved to the United Kingdom at the age of 15 with her family in the face of growing antisemitism in Hungary. In the UK she was educated at Hove County School for Girls and Prince Henry VIII Grammar School, Evesham. She attended Newnham College, Cambridge, studying Natural Sciences at a time when women did not formally receive a degree. 
She went on to gain an MA in 1948 and DSc in 1973

Career 

Following her studies, Kennard worked as a research assistant at the Cavendish Laboratory, Cambridge from 1944 to 1948, working with Max Perutz on the structure of hemoglobin. After this she moved to London, working at the Medical Research Council RC Vision Research Unit from 1948 to 1951. In this role she studied rhodopsin and vitamin A with Hamilton Hartridge. Subsequently, she was a research assistant, establishing a crystallographic lab at the MRC National Institute for Medical Research.
In 1961 Kennard returned to work in Cambridge (where she had lived whilst working in London) to the University's chemistry department to set up Crystallography Unit. She remained in this department until retirement. During her career she has produced over 200 scientific papers and written several books.

Kennard was best known as a founder of the Cambridge Structural Database and first director (from 1965 to 1997) of the Cambridge Crystallographic Data Centre. The resource was borne of her belief that "collective use of data would lead to the discovery of new knowledge which transcends the results of individual experiments".

Kennard held an MRC special appointment from 1974 to 1989 and was visiting professor at the University of London from 1988 to 1990.

Honours and awards 
Kennard was elected a Fellow of the Royal Society (FRS) in 1987 and appointed an Officer of the Order of the British Empire (OBE) "for services to Scientific Research on the Structure of Biological Molecules" in the 1988 Birthday Honours. In recognition of her work, there is the Olga Kennard Research Fellowship in crystallography, administered by the Royal Society. The current Royal Society Olga Kennard Research Fellow is Jon Agirre (University of York).

In 1993 she was elected a member of the Academia Europaea.

In 2003 the University of Cambridge made her a Doctor of Law honoris causa.

In 2020, the IUCr awarded Dr Kennard the 12th Ewald Prize for her "invaluable pioneering contribution to the development of crystallographic databases".

Personal life and death 
Kennard was married to Sir Arnold Burgen, her second husband, until his death in May 2022. Her first husband was David Kennard, to whom she was married from 1948 to 1961, together having two daughters. Her niece is English actress Rachel Weisz.

After retirement, Kennard was appointed a trustee of the British Museum in 2004, a position held until 2012.
She was an 'architecture aficionado' and lived in a Grade II listed house designed by Danish architect, Erik Sorensen.

The National Portrait Gallery holds her portrait.

Kennard died on 1 March 2023, at the age of 98.

References

External links 

 

1924 births
2023 deaths
British Jews
British crystallographers
Alumni of the University of Cambridge
Female Fellows of the Royal Society
Jewish scientists
Members of Academia Europaea
Officers of the Order of the British Empire
Trustees of the British Museum
British people of Hungarian-Jewish descent
Hungarian emigrants to the United Kingdom
Wives of knights
Scientists from Budapest